Settala is a comune (municipality) in the Province of Milan in the Italian region Lombardy, located about  east of Milan.

The municipality of Settala contains the frazioni (subdivisions, mainly villages and hamlets) Premenugo and Caleppio.

Settala borders the following municipalities: Vignate, Rodano, Liscate, Comazzo, Merlino, Pantigliate, Paullo, Mediglia.

Demographic evolution

References

External links
 www.comune.settala.mi.it/

Cities and towns in Lombardy